Mandarin Oriental, New York is a five-star hotel located in Manhattan's Deutsche Bank Center at Columbus Circle in New York City, managed by Mandarin Oriental Hotel Group. A part of the multi-use Time Warner Center development, the hotel opened in December 2003. In addition to its 248 guestrooms and suites, the hotel provides services for 64 residences. The Mandarin Oriental has received many national and international awards, and operates one of only two Forbes Five-Star spas in Manhattan.

Hotel
The AAA Five-Diamond awarded hotel contains 202 guestrooms and 46 suites on floors 35 to 54 of the Time Warner Center with views of Central Park and the Hudson River.

Vivienne Tam, a noted New York fashion designer, designed the hotel’s signature fan, which is displayed in the hotel lobby. Dale Chihuly created two glass pieces installed in the hotel. The first is a chandelier, created in a unique collaboration with Waterford Crystal, weighing approximately 2,100 pounds and comprising 683 hand blown glass and crystal pieces. The second installation, located in the 35th floor lobby, is Chihuly’s first foray into glass gardens.

A 250-year-old parchment calligraphy book, conveying a story of happiness and good fortune, and a collection of carved ornaments from furnishings of the same period are housed in the Presidential Suite.

The hotel closed temporarily in 2020 during the COVID-19 pandemic in New York City, reopening in April 2021. Reliance Industries bought a majority stake in the Mandarin Oriental New York in January 2022 for $98 million. Since 2013, the General Manager of Mandarin Oriental New York has been Susanne Hatje.

Spa

The Spa is one of only two Forbes Five-Star spas in Manhattan (The other is the Peninsula New York Spa), is located on the 35th and 36th floors of the hotel and spans . It offers traditional treatments, such as massages, manicures and pedicures in addition to a list of unique signature therapies, including a vitamin infused facial, the “Clearing Factor” and a Thai yoga massage.

In 2017, Adam D. Tihany, Grant Achatz and Nick Kokonas jointly re-designed the Spa.

Restaurants and bars
Asiate: contemporary cuisine with Asian influences on the 35th floor overlooking Central Park

Former bars
The Aviary NYC (2017-2020): a high-end cocktail lounge adjacent to Asiate with views overlooking Columbus Circle
The Office NYC (2017-2020)

Additional services and facilities
Fitness center and indoor pool: a  fitness center and  lap pool
Meeting and event space: a  pillar-less ballroom overlooking Central Park and three executive meeting rooms

Residences
The Residences at Mandarin Oriental, New York are a collection of 64 condominiums located directly above the hotel on floors 64–80. The full-service apartments have complete access to the hotel’s amenities & services – including the concierge, housekeeping, room service and fitness center.

Awards
 Top 50 Large Hotels in US/Canada (Travel + Leisure World’s Best Awards, August 2009)
 Top Mainland US Hotels (Celebrated Living Platinum List, Summer 2009)
One of the Best Hotels in the World (Travel + Leisure Guide to The World’s Best Hotels, January 2009)
One of the World’s Best Places to Stay (Condé Nast Traveler Gold List, January 2009)
Asiate selected No. 1 in Décor (Zagat Survey New York City Restaurants, 2008, 2009, 2010)
Asiate selected “Forbes 2008 All-Star Eatery” in New York City (Forbes, December 2008)
Asiate selected best restaurant for a “Power Breakfast” in New York City (New York Magazine, June 2008)
The Spa recognized as a Top Hotel Spa in The Americas & Caribbean (Condé Nast Traveller Spa Awards (UK), February 2008)
Mandarin Oriental, New York, awarded the Five Diamond Award (AAA, November 2008) 
Mandarin Oriental, New York, and The Spa received the Five-Star Award (Forbes Travel Guide, 2010)
General source:

See also
Mandarin Oriental Hotel Group

References

External links
 Official website
 [www.aviarynyc.com official website of the designer  Adam D. Tihany, on redesigning the Spa Aviary.]

Mandarin Oriental Hotel Group
Columbus Circle
Skyscraper hotels in Manhattan
Hotels established in 2003
Hotel buildings completed in 2003